Bharathapuzha,  the debut film of writer director Manilal, is the story of Sugandhi, a sex worker who attempts to navigate through the social mores of life around her.  Her journeys transgress gender and class divisions,  and explore relationships that are organic and beyond the narrow confines imposed by society.

Plot
Sugandhi is the central character in the film. She is a sex worker and the story progresses through various incidents in her life. It is also a journey through Thrissur town, and through several people from different walks of life. Her journeys map and meander through the geography and humanscape of Trichur, a town presided over by the God of Destruction but pulsating with desires and dreams of the multitude. The film is also about the various ways and means through which people weave their own lives – sometimes as a carnival of possibilities, but most often as a hell of rules and inhibitions, self-inflicted, imagined or imposed by society. Through Sugandhi, the film explores the joys and freedoms of earth that must, should or could be for all.

Awards

51st Kerala State Film Awards
 Kerala State Film Award – Special Mention Siji Pradeep for acting 
 Kerala State Film Award – Special Mention Nalini Jameela for Costume design

Cast
Siji Pradeep As Sugandhi
Irshad (actor) As Gulfukaran
Sreejith Ravi As Doctor friend
Manikandan Pattambi as Priest 
M. G. Sasi As Writer Friend
Sunil Sukhada Friend
Dinesh Engoor
Achudanandan

References

External links 
 
ഭാരതപപഴ എനന സിനിമയടെ പരീമിയർ ഷോ കൊചചിയിൽ നടതതി
‘Bharathapuzha’, directed by Manilal, is about the never-say-die attitude of a marginalised woman
In love with Bharathappuzha
‘Bharathapuzha’, directed by Manilal, is about the never-say-die attitude of a marginalised woman
Bharathapuzha Official Teaser

Films postponed due to the COVID-19 pandemic
Unreleased Malayalam-language films